Tylothais virgata is a species of sea snail, a marine gastropod mollusk, in the family Muricidae, the murex snails or rock snails.

Description
The shell size varies between 25 mm and 60 mm

Distribution
This species occurs in the Red Sea, in the Indian Ocean off Madagascar and in the Indo-Pacific; also off Thailand.

References

 Dautzenberg, P. (1923). Liste preliminaire des mollusques marins de Madagascar et description de deux especes nouvelles. Journal de Conchyliologie 68: 21–74
 Dautzenberg, Ph. (1929). Mollusques testaces marins de Madagascar. Faune des Colonies Francaises, Tome III
 Vine, P. (1986). Red Sea Invertebrates. Immel Publishing, London. 224 pp
 Houart, R. (2017). Description of eight new species and one new genus of Muricidae (Gastropoda) from the Indo-West Pacific. Novapex. 18 (4): 81-103.

External links
 Dunker, W. & Zelebor, J. (1866). Bericht über die von der Novara-Expedition mitgebrachten Mollusken. Verhandlungen der Kaiserlich-Königlichen Zoologisch-Botanischen Gesellschaft in Wien. 16: 909-916.
 Gmelin J.F. (1791). Vermes. In: Gmelin J.F. (Ed.) Caroli a Linnaei Systema Naturae per Regna Tria Naturae, Ed. 13. Tome 1(6). G.E. Beer, Lipsiae

virgata
Gastropods described in 1817